This is a list of submissions to the 93rd Academy Awards for the Best International Feature Film. The Academy of Motion Picture Arts and Sciences (AMPAS) has invited the film industries of various countries to submit their best film for the Academy Award for Best International Feature Film every year since the award was created in 1956. The award is presented annually by the Academy to a feature-length motion picture produced outside the United States that contains primarily non-English dialogue. The International Feature Film Award Committee oversees the process and reviews all the submitted films. The category was previously called the Best Foreign Language Film, but this was changed in April 2019 to Best International Feature Film, after the Academy deemed the word "Foreign" to be outdated.

For the 93rd Academy Awards, the submitted motion pictures must be first released theatrically in their respective countries between 1 October 2019 and 31 December 2020. The deadline for submissions to the Academy was 1 December 2020. A total of 97 countries submitted a film, with a record number of 93 being accepted. Three countries submitted a film for the first time. Lesotho sent This Is Not a Burial, It's a Resurrection, Sudan sent You Will Die at Twenty, and Suriname sent Wiren. Bhutan sent Lunana: A Yak in the Classroom after a gap of 21 years from their last submission, but the film did not appear on the final list.

The shortlist was announced on 9 February 2021, and due to the coronavirus situation, it was extended to fifteen films from the original ten. Also, unlike the previous years, no additions were made by the International Executive Committee. The final five nominees were announced on 15 March 2021. Another Round by Thomas Vinterberg won the award for Denmark.

Submissions

Notes
  The Algerian film Héliopolis was withdrawn by the director in consultation with the Algerian selection committee and AMPAS, after the film's national premiere was canceled due to COVID-19. The filmmakers announced their intention to compete the following year and the film was submitted successfully for the 94th Academy Awards.
  In January 2021, the Belarusian submission, Persian Lessons, was disqualified by the Academy, after it was determined that Belarus did not exercise "creative control" over the film. The film, an international co-production between Russia, Germany, and Belarus, did not have any Belarusian citizens in key positions. 
  In September 2020, the Bhutanese Ministry of Information and Communications announced that the country had submitted Lunana: A Yak in the Classroom as the country's second-ever Oscar submission. However, AMPAS ruled that the film hadn't been chosen by an approved selection committee. The film was allowed to be re-submitted the following year, where it won Bhutan's first-ever Oscar nomination. 
  Canada's original submission Funny Boy was disqualified for having more than half of its dialogue in English. Canada's selection committee submitted a second film, 14 Days, 12 Nights.
  Nepal announced a shortlist of two films: Aama and Sarita but ultimately did not send either film. 
  In December 2020, Portugal's submission Listen was disqualified for having more than half of its dialogue in English. Portugal's selection committee submitted a second film, Vitalina Varela. 
  Uzbekistan's submission 2000 Songs of Farida was disqualified, because the Oscar Committee of Uzbekistan did not submit the film in the appropriate format required by AMPAS. The following year, the film was submitted successfully for the 94th Academy Awards.
 The Oscar Selection Committees for Ghana, Malawi, and Uganda invited local filmmakers to submit films for Oscar consideration, but no films were sent.

Footnotes

References

External links
 Official website of the Academy Awards

2019 in film
2020 in film
93